Kingella kingae is a species of Gram-negative facultative anaerobic β-hemolytic coccobacilli. First isolated in 1960 by Elizabeth O. King, it was not recognized as a significant cause of infection in young children until the 1990s, when culture techniques had improved enough for it to be recognized. It is best known as a cause of septic arthritis, osteomyelitis, spondylodiscitis, bacteraemia, and endocarditis, and less frequently lower respiratory tract infections and meningitis.

There are four species  of Kingella: K. kingae, the most common, is part of the bacterial flora of the throat in young children and is transmitted from child to child. When it causes disease, the clinical presentation is often subtle and preceded by a recent history of stomatitis or upper respiratory infection. Other species are K. indologenes, K. denitrificans (both causing endocarditis) and   K. oralis found in dental plaque.

One notable exception is in cases of endocarditis (heart valve infection), which can be more refractory to treatment. K. kingae is the fifth member of the HACEK group of fastidious Gram-negative bacteria that cause endocarditis. Routine laboratory tests may be normal because the organism is difficult to culture. Inoculating the fluid from infected joints directly into blood culture vials can enhance the chances of an accurate culture, but extended culture times are not helpful.

The organism has also been known as Moraxella kingae.

K. kingae  is oxidase-positive, catalase-negative, and beta-hemolytic.

Mechanism of infection

Kingella kingae is thought to begin infection by colonizing the pharynx, crossing the epithelium by using an RTX toxin, and entering the circulation and reaching deeper tissues, such as bones and joints.

K. kingae expresses type IV pili, which allow for enhanced adhesion to respiratory epithelial and synovial cells and thus increased likelihood of colonization. These pili have also been shown to be reduced in number as pathogenesis progresses. σ54 regulates the transcription of pilA1, a major pilus subunit. PilS and PilR, regulatory transcription factors best known from the Pseudomonas aeruginosa pilus system, also may regulate pilA expression. High levels of type IV pili on K. kingae are associated with spreading/corroding colony types, while low levels of type IV pili are associated with nonspreading/noncorroding colony types of K. kingae. The three different types of populations are: spreading/corroding (with high-density piliation), nonspreading/noncorroding colonies (low density piliation), and domed colonies (no piliation, and thus no adherence to epithelium). Generally, respiratory and nonendocarditis infections tend to be highly piliated, while joint fluid, bone, and endocarditis blood isolates are less piliated, if at all.

Spondylodiscitis

Children under three years of age may become infected with K. kingae and develop spondylodiscitis. Typical symptoms include back pain, abdominal pain, and damage to the bones and joints. It generally targets the lumbar region of the spinal cord, and the only true way of diagnosing it is through biopsy or needle aspiration, as blood plate growth gives many false negatives.

Osteomyelitis

Osteomyelitis occurs in previously healthy children. The infection rate is poorly documented, thus the illness tends to go underdiagnosed. K. kingae can be transmitted person to person in rare cases. Diagnostic tools include low-grade fever, elevated inflammatory markers (ESR and CRP), but white blood cell counts are generally unreliable since they vary among infected patients. K. kingae infections are generally comcomitant with upper respiratory diseases or stomatitis, since disrupted respiratory or buccal mucosa is likely to facilitate bacterial invasion and hematogenous dissemination.

The cause of osteoarticular infections is frequently not identified. Less than 15% of K. kingae-positive clinical specimens reveal organisms on Gram stain.  Infections due to K. kingae are treatable with a wide variety of antibiotics, such as beta-lactams, tetracyclines, erythromycin, and fluoroquinolones. Minimum inhibitory concentrations of penicillins, rifampicin, and azithromycin are easily achieved.
Multiple studies have shown that inoculating synovial fluid or bone samples directly into blood culture bottles substantially increases the detection of K. kingae compared with direct plating of specimens on solid media.

As an oropharyngeal colonizer, K. kingae is transmitted by respiratory secretions, saliva, and potentially oral contact with contaminated objects. Recent studies suggest K. kingae strains may demonstrate varying degrees of pathogenicity, which could support the person-to-person transfer of pathogenic K. kingae. Infection has been shown to have high prevalence in the autumn and winter months.

Infections in adults
K.kingae infections are rare in adults, but they occur in immunocompromised patients. Poor oral hygiene, pharyngitis, and mucosal ulceration are also predisposing factors for infection. The infection can occur in the respiratory or urinary tracts, as it is a part of the normal flora in those two areas, and will develop into sepsis or septic arthritis. Most K. kingae are sensitive  to beta-lactam antibiotics, but reports describe  strains producing beta-lactamases. Options include aminoglycosides, macrolides and fluoroquinolones. K. kingae can also cause infectious endocarditis, in children as well as in adults.

References

External links
Kingella kingae at NCBI Taxonomy Browser (id=504)
Type strain of Kingella kingae at BacDive -  the Bacterial Diversity Metadatabase

Neisseriales
Gram-negative bacteria